Beaver Creek in Carbon County, Pennsylvania is an east-to-west-running tributary of the Lehigh River giving name to and draining the southern terrains of Beaver Meadows into Black Creek.
 name=GmapMeas>Distance measured on Google map using ruler tool from west end of pond to intersection listed. co-ords of source are 40.921497, -75.934440, Banks Township, PA.
</ref> in Junedale, one unincorporated village (neighborhood) of Banks Township at the northwestern corner of Carbon County, Pennsylvania, and runs nearly due east-northeast through the center of Beaver Meadows, Pennsylvania  to the approximate centerline of Weatherly, where it turns abruptly and runs due south 1.25 miles through the center of Weatherly, where,  from its source, it merges with Hazle Creek, thereby forming Black Creek, Pennsylvania, which turns abruptly east from its origin.


History of the region
The streams played a large role in the development of the Province of Pennsylvania as a turnpike was constructed from Lausanne along Black Creek and Beaver Creek, north from Beaver Meadows, Pennsylvania to the Susquehanna River, and the developing Industrializing United States, as a 19th-century transportation corridor hosting the Beaver Meadows Railroad connecting Beaver Meadows via Weatherly and Penn Haven Junction to the Lehigh Canal.

See also
List of rivers of Pennsylvania

Notes

References

Tributaries of the Lehigh River
Rivers of Pennsylvania
Rivers of Carbon County, Pennsylvania